The Errol Flynn Theatre is an anthology series presented by Errol Flynn, who would also play the lead in every fourth show. His wife Patrice Wymore and son Sean also made appearances.

Production
Filming started 1 March 1956 and was done by Inter Film TV.

It was shot in England at Bray Studios but was made for the American market. In May 1956 Flynn said all money from the show went to pay for his debts.

Episodes

Reception
Filmink magazine later wrote that watching the show "you get the sense of what some of his [Flynn's] work for Northampton Rep must have been like – playing all sorts of different roles, sometimes pulling it off, other times not so much."

Archive Status
All 26 episodes exist and are held at ITV.

References

External links
The Errol Flynn Theatre at IMDb
The Errol Flynn Theatre at Classic TV Archive
'Strange Auction' from Errol Flynn Theatre at Internet Archive

1956 American television series debuts
1958 American television series endings